The Luzerne County Council is elected by the voters of the county. The governing body consists of eleven members. Nearly half the council is up for election every two years. It rotates between five and six seats. Each council member is elected at-large (to a four-year term). Councilors may serve no more than three consecutive terms.

In the May primary, the major political parties (Democratic and Republican) select their top candidates for the general election. For example, those who place in the top five or six become the nominees of their party. Third party (or independent) candidates may also join the race. In the November general election, all political parties/candidates square off on the same ballot. Those who place in the top five or six will be elected or re-elected to council.

Background
On Tuesday, November 2, 2010, Luzerne County adopted a home rule charter by a margin of 51,413 to 41,639. The following year (in 2011), the first election for the new government was held. On Monday, January 2, 2012, the previous government (the board of county commissioners) was abolished and replaced with the new form of government (council–manager government). The first members of the Luzerne County Council were sworn in that same day. The council chair, who is appointed by his or her fellow council members, is both the highest-ranking officer on the council and the head of county government for ceremonial purposes. The first council chair was Jim Bobeck.

Elections

2011
The first general election for Luzerne County Council was held on Tuesday, November 8, 2011. The first eleven members were elected. Initially, the political makeup of council consisted of six Democrats, four Republicans, and one independent. The first councilors were Rick Morelli, Stephen A. Urban, Jim Bobeck, Stephen J. Urban, Tim McGinley, Edward Brominski, Harry Haas, Rick Williams, Elaine Maddon Curry, Linda McClosky Houck, and Eugene Kelleher. Rick Morelli was the highest vote-getter (with 25,026 votes). The newly elected government was sworn in on January 2, 2012. Democrat Jim Bobeck, who came in third during the general election, was appointed by his fellow council members to serve as the first council chair.

2013
The second general election was held on Tuesday, November 5, 2013. Five seats were up for election. Elaine Maddon Curry did not seek re-election. Councilwoman Linda McClosky Houck was the top vote-getter (with 18,980 votes). Eileen Sorokas and Kathy Dobash were both newly elected to council. Eugene Kelleher was the only incumbent to lose his seat in the general election. In the end, the number of seats per political party remained the same—six Democrats, four Republicans, and one independent.

2015
The third general election was held on Tuesday, November 3, 2015. Six seats were up for election. Jim Bobeck and Rick Morelli did not seek re-election. During the May primary, Democrat Robert Schnee lost the Democratic nomination, but won the Republican nomination with 384 write-in votes. In the November general election, Robert Schnee and Jane Walsh-Waitkus were both newly elected to council. Even though Schnee won the election as a Republican, he went on to serve as a Democrat. Former Councilman Eugene Kelleher, who lost his seat two years earlier, was elected in 2015. Stephen J. Urban was the only incumbent to lose his seat in the general election.

2017
The fourth general election was held on Tuesday, November 7, 2017. Five seats were up for election. Kathy Dobash, Eileen Sorokas, and Rick Williams (the only independent on council) did not seek re-election. Sheila Saidman, Matthew Vough, and Chris R. Perry were newly elected to council. In the end, the Democratic majority grew from seven seats to eight.

2019
The fifth general election was held on Tuesday, November 5, 2019. Six seats were up for election. Republican Eugene Kelleher and Democrat Stephen A. Urban did not seek re-election. Democratic Councilman Edward Brominski, who was up for re-election that year, resigned in January 2019 due to health issues. By February, the council appointed Patrick Bilbow to serve out the remainder of his term.

During the primary—Tuesday, May 21—the Democrats managed to fill all six nomination slots. The Democratic nominees were Tim McGinley (13,089 votes), Joseph Sebastianelli (11,253 votes), Jane Walsh-Waitkus (11,026 votes), Patrick Bilbow (11,001 votes), Robert Schnee (9,303 votes), and Anup Patel (8,731 votes).

Only four Republicans appeared on the primary ballot. They comfortably secured their party's nomination. The Republican nominees were Stephen J. Urban (9,308 votes), Walter Griffith (8,969 votes), Kendra Radle (8,238 votes), and Gregory Wolovich (7,915 votes). The remaining two nominees were selected through write-in votes. Lee Ann McDermott, with 454 write-in votes, and Councilman Robert Schnee, with 417 write-in votes, filled the two remaining Republican slots. Because Schnee had also won the Democratic nomination, he became the only candidate in council history to appear on the November ballot as both a Democrat and a Republican.

During the November general election, the balance of power shifted for the first time in council history—the Republicans secured a majority. Republicans Lee Ann McDermott, Walter Griffith, and Kendra Radle were newly elected to council. Former Republican Councilman Stephen J. Urban, who lost his seat four years earlier, was also elected. Democrats Patrick Bilbow and Jane Walsh-Waitkus were the only two incumbents to lose their seats. Due to straight-party voting and the fact that he appeared on the ballot as both a Democrat and a Republican, Robert Schnee's total of 28,588 votes stood as the largest tally ever won by a council candidate until 2021, when this was surpassed by Republican John Lombardo. Even though Schnee secured both the Democratic and Republican nominations in 2019, he was sworn in as a Democrat in January 2020.

|-
! style="background-color: #800080; width: 2px;" |
| style="width: 130px" | Democratic/Republican
|               | Robert W. Schnee (incumbent)
| align="right" | 28,588
| align="right" | 11.02
|-

2021
The sixth general election was held on Tuesday, November 2, 2021. Five seats were up for election. Democrat Linda McClosky Houck and Republican Harry Haas were ineligible to pursue a fourth consecutive term due to term limits. During the summer of 2020, Councilman Robert Schnee switched his registration from Democrat to Republican, creating a 7-4 Republican majority. During the November general election, one party swept all five seats, which was unprecedented in council history. Republicans John Lombardo, Brian Thornton, Kevin Lescavage, and Gregory Wolovich were newly elected to council. John Lombardo became the highest vote-getter in council history (with over 31,000 votes). Democrats Matthew Vough and Sheila Saidman were the only two incumbents to lose their seats. In the end, the Republican majority grew from seven seats to ten, leaving only one Democrat on council (Tim McGinley).

2023
The seventh general election for Luzerne County Council will take place in 2023. The primary is scheduled for Tuesday, May 16, 2023. There will be six Democratic nominees, six Republican nominees, and potentially several independent/third-party candidates seeking office. Those who place in the top six during the general election—Tuesday, November 7, 2023—will go on to serve as councilors.

References

Luzerne County, Pennsylvania
Government of Luzerne County, Pennsylvania